Takol Hasan (also Romanized as Takol Ḩasan; also known as Takolḩasan-e Bālā) is a village in Jazmurian Rural District, Jazmurian District, Rudbar-e Jonubi County, Kerman Province, Iran. At the 2006 census, its population was 338, in 73 families.

References 

Populated places in Rudbar-e Jonubi County